Super Mai Khola Cascade Hydropower Station (Nepali: सुपर माई खोला क्यसकेड जलविद्युत आयोजना) is a run-of-river hydro-electric plant located in   Ilam District of Nepal. The flow from Mai River is used to generate 3.8 MW electricity.

The plant is owned and developed by Mai Khola Hydropower Pvt.Ltd., an IPP of Nepal. The plant started generating electricity from 2077-03-31BS. The generation licence will expire in 2110-11-04 BS, after which the plant will be handed over to the government.  The power station is connected to the national grid and the electricity is sold to Nepal Electricity Authority.

Finance
The project cost was NPR 55.75 crore, from which 41.75 crore is financed by the bank and remaining is private equity from the developer.

See also

List of power stations in Nepal

References

Hydroelectric power stations in Nepal
Gravity dams
Run-of-the-river power stations
Dams in Nepal
Irrigation in Nepal
Buildings and structures in Ilam District